The 2008–09 Austrian Hockey League season was the 79th season of the Austrian Hockey League, the top level of ice hockey in Austria. 10 teams participated in the league, and EC KAC won the championship.

Regular season

Playoffs

Quarterfinals
 EC KAC - HC TWK Innsbruck 4:2 (8:2, 2:3, 5:2, 1:3, 5:0, 3:1)
 Vienna Capitals - Graz 99ers 4:3 (6:0, 1:2, 3:2, 3:2, 1:3, 1:2, 5:1)
 EC Red Bull Salzburg - HK Jesenice 4:1 (3:2 P, 2:6, 9:1, 3:1, 4:1)
 EC VSV - EHC Linz 2:4 (1:2, 1:2, 5:2, 2:3, 2:1, 0:2)

Semifinals
 EC KAC - EHC Linz 4:0 (2:0, 4:2, 5:1, 5:3)
 Vienna Capitals - EC Red Bull Salzburg 1:4 (4:3 P, 2:4, 1:4, 1:2, 3:5)

Final
 EC KAC - EC Red Bull Salzburg 4:3 (5:4 P, 2:7, 3:6, 4:1, 3:0, 2:3 P, 2:1)

External links
Austrian Ice Hockey Association

Austrian Hockey League seasons
Aus
1
Aus
2008–09 in Hungarian ice hockey